Dino Claudio M. Sanchez is the incumbent vice mayor of Butuan, Philippines. He was also a former councilor before winning the vice-mayoralty position in the May 2007 elections. He comes from a family with a long history of public service.

A graduate of San Beda College, Sanchez is a wide reader of books on public administration, philosophy, World Wars I and II, international parliamentary structures and world history. He is fluent in English, Tagalog, Cebuano and Butuanon dialects.

References

Year of birth missing (living people)
Living people
People from Agusan del Norte
People from Butuan
San Beda University alumni
Lakas–CMD politicians
Filipino city and municipal councilors